FK506-binding protein 10 is a protein that in humans is encoded by the FKBP10 gene.

The protein encoded by this gene belongs to the FKBP-type peptidyl-prolyl cis/trans isomerase family. It is located in endoplasmic reticulum and acts as molecular chaperones. Two alternatively spliced variants, which encode different isoform, are reported.

References

Further reading

 
 
 
 
 
 
 

EC 5.2.1
EF-hand-containing proteins